The following lists events that happened in 2000 in Iceland.

Incumbents
President – Ólafur Ragnar Grímsson 
Prime Minister – Davíð Oddsson

Events

June
 June 17 and 21 - 2000 Iceland earthquakes

 
2000s in Iceland
Iceland
Iceland
Years of the 20th century in Iceland